Mount Martin is a mountain,  high, with conspicuous rock exposures on its southeast side, standing immediately north of the head of Anthony Glacier on the east coast of Palmer Land, Antarctica. The mountain lies on the fringe of the area explored by the British Graham Land Expedition in 1936, and was photographed from the air by the United States Antarctic Service in 1940. During 1947 it was photographed from the air by members of the Ronne Antarctic Research Expedition, under Finn Ronne, who in conjunction with the Falkland Islands Dependencies Survey charted it from the ground. The mountain was named by Ronne for electronics engineer Orville Martin, who was of assistance in planning and obtaining radio equipment necessary for Ronne's expedition.

References

Mountains of Palmer Land